Waltham Toll Bar Academy and 6th Form College is a co-educational secondary school and sixth form, in New Waltham, North East Lincolnshire, England.

Admissions
A secondary school with a sixth form, it serves 11- to 18-year-olds. The largest school in North East Lincolnshire, it has around 2,000 pupils.
Students come from Grimsby, Cleethorpes, and surrounding Lincolnshire villages.

History
The original school was opened in 1937 for 300 pupils. It became the Tollbar Secondary Modern School. Further expansion occurred in the 1970s, and has continued. It is situated on the junction of the A16 and B1219. The school later became Tollbar Business and Enterprise College, changing to Tollbar Business, Enterprise and Humanities College in 2008/9. In autumn 2010 the school gained Academy status, once again changing its name to Tollbar Academy. It was one of the first to change to an Academy under the new legislation as implemented by the 2010 Coalition government.

Academic performance
In July 2002, it was awarded Business and Enterprise College status. In September 2004, it was awarded foundation school status.  In October of the same year it announced that it was going to introduce a 5 term year.
The sixth form is a partnership with Grimsby Institute of Further & Higher Education. It gets the best GCSE results in North East Lincolnshire LEA, and the best A level results followed by Franklin College.

In May 2008, Principal David Hampson suspended 74 pupils for using the school computers to play a game based on the film Tron. The game was downloaded by students. The school also forbids mobile phones or any other electronic equipment.

In September 2012, the academy was ranked number 1 in the government "Similar Schools" table, which ranks schools by results against schools with a similar intake.

As of 2023, the school's most recent inspection by Ofsted was in 2013, when it was judged Outstanding. It was one of only two secondary schools in North-East Lincolnshire to receive the highest category of inspection judgement under the new, more rigorous, inspection standards.

Notable former pupils

 Paul Wilkinson, professional footballer and manager.
 Angela Smith, Change UK MP for Sheffield Hillsborough
 Jason Stockwood, Businessman and Chairman of Grimsby Town
 Liam Davis (footballer, born 1990), English semi-professional footballer.
Edwin Essel, professional footballer.

Notes

External links 
 Official school website

Educational institutions established in 1937
Secondary schools in the Borough of North East Lincolnshire
1937 establishments in England
Academies in the Borough of North East Lincolnshire